Trifolium alexandrinum (Egyptian clover, berseem clover) is an annual clover cultivated mostly in irrigated sub-tropical regions, and used as leguminous crop. It is an important winter crop in Egypt, where it may have been cultivated since ancient times, and was introduced into northern India in the early nineteenth century. It is also grown in the United States, Europe, China and Australia.

There are two types of berseem clover, single-cut and multi-cut. Single-cut varieties, like 'Balady', feature a high growing point and have poor recovery once harvested. Multi-cut varieties, like 'Frosty', feature a lower growing point allowing for multiple harvests from a single sowing.

Berseem clover is generally frost-sensitive and should be planted only after potential for frost has passed. The exception is 'Frosty' berseem clover which was developed by Grassland Oregon, Inc. and released in 2016.

Forage 
Berseem clover is capable of producing up to 8 tons of forage in a single growing season. Berseem clover is similar in forage quality to that of alfalfa.

Green manure 
Berseem clover can also be used as a cover crop suppressing weeds or as a green manure crop providing nitrogen to following crops. As a green manure crop, berseem is capable of providing as much as 280 lbs./acre of nitrogen to following crops.

Berseem as fodder 
Berseem provides highly nutritious and tasty fodder for livestock in winter season in repeated cuttings. It contains 17% crude protein, 25.9% crude fiber and 60-65% TDN (Total Digestible Nutrients) content. Berseem needs a mild temperature to germinate and further establishment. Its growth is restricted during severe cold or frosty weather. It grows well on medium to heavy soils and resists salinity.

References

External links
Berseem clover - State of New South Wales through NSW Department of Primary Industries 2007

alexandrinum
Fodder
Flora of Egypt
Flora of Sinai
Flora of Palestine (region)
Flora of Iraq
Flora of the Gulf States
Flora of Iran
Flora of Pakistan
Plants described in 1755
Taxa named by Carl Linnaeus